Zachary Jason Ansley (born 21 January 1972) is a Canadian actor and lawyer. He has been acting professionally since he was eleven years old. He was the winner of the first YTV Acting Award (1989). A graduate of Circle in the Square Acting School, New York City, after graduation he acted with Willow Cabin Theatre, New York, before returning to Vancouver to resume his film and television career.  As a teenager, he was honored with a Genie nomination. He currently practices law with Owen Bird Law Corporation in Vancouver, British Columbia.

Filmography

Film

Television

References

External links 
 
 TV.com
 Hollywood.com

Canadian male film actors
Canadian male television actors
1972 births
Living people
Canadian male child actors
Circle in the Square Theatre School alumni
Male actors from Vancouver
21st-century Canadian lawyers
20th-century Canadian male actors
21st-century Canadian male actors